

417001–417100 

|-bgcolor=#f2f2f2
| colspan=4 align=center | 
|}

417101–417200 

|-bgcolor=#f2f2f2
| colspan=4 align=center | 
|}

417201–417300 

|-bgcolor=#f2f2f2
| colspan=4 align=center | 
|}

417301–417400 

|-bgcolor=#f2f2f2
| colspan=4 align=center | 
|}

417401–417500 

|-bgcolor=#f2f2f2
| colspan=4 align=center | 
|}

417501–417600 

|-bgcolor=#f2f2f2
| colspan=4 align=center | 
|}

417601–417700 

|-bgcolor=#f2f2f2
| colspan=4 align=center | 
|}

417701–417800 

|-bgcolor=#f2f2f2
| colspan=4 align=center | 
|}

417801–417900 

|-bgcolor=#f2f2f2
| colspan=4 align=center | 
|}

417901–418000 

|-id=955
| 417955 Mallama ||  || Anthony Mallama (born 1949) is known for his research on the brightness and variability of all eight planets in the Solar System. These investigations revealed important characteristics of their atmospheres, surfaces and interiors. || 
|-id=978
| 417978 Haslehner ||  || The Haslehner family, who are the neighbors of the Gaisberg Observatory  in Schärding, Austria. It was only with their support that it was possible to build the observatory. || 
|}

References 

417001-418000